Baseball pocket billiards or baseball pool (sometimes, in context, referred to simply as baseball) is a pocket billiards (pool) game suitable for multiple players that borrows phraseology and even some aspects of form from the game of baseball. For instance, although baseball pool is played on a standard pool table, the 9 ball is known as the "pitcher", the table's  where balls are racked is known as "home plate", and each team or player is afforded "nine innings" to score as many "runs" as possible.

Baseball pocket billiards has been in existence since at least 1912, when Brunswick soberly described it in a pamphlet as "the most fascinating game of the twentieth century." The game has relatively simple rules. The winner is the player with the highest run tally after all players have taken nine turns "at bat".

Gameplay

Set-up

Baseball pocket billiards is played with 21 numbered . Since a standard set of pool balls is numbered 1 through 15, sets of balls numbered 16 through 21, known as "baseball sets", have been marketed specifically for the game, along with the oversized triangle racks needed for proper .

Viewed from the racker's vantage point, the 1-ball is placed at the triangle's apex, the 2-ball at the right corner, and the 3-ball at the left corner, similar to that of rotation. The 9-ball, called the "pitcher", is placed at what would be the center of the rack if the game were to be played with 15 balls. All other balls are placed randomly. Because most physical racks only accommodate 15 balls, the last row of balls may be placed manually after placement with a standard triangle.

Object of the game
Any incidental balls pocketed on a successful called shot count in the player's favor but must be spotted to home plate if unsuccessful. Each player is allowed nine  at the table, played in succession, in which to score as many runs as possible. The game ends when all players have completed their rounds. The winner is the player with the most runs after all have finished their turn "at bat".

Scoring
Each legally pocketed ball garners the shooter the numerical face value of the ball. For example, pocketing the 2- and 15-balls during an inning results in a score of 17 runs for that . Scores must be contemporaneously recorded on a score sheet with the total tally for each inning marked. If a player pockets all 21 balls before his inning allotment ends, the balls are re-racked and play continues, with a re-break from the kitchen.

Penalty for fouls
The penalty for a foul is a loss of turn, no score for the ball or balls pocketed on the fouled stroke, as well as no score for the immediately preceding pocketed ball during any inning. This means that if a player did not legally pocket a ball on the  preceding the foul, the last ball pocketed in the last scoring inning is spotted and subtracted from that prior inning's score. If the player has not yet made any balls at the time of the foul, the first subsequent ball pocketed is spotted at the inning's conclusion and does not count toward the player's score.

References

Pool (cue sports)